The Romantic era of Western Classical music spanned the 19th century to the early 20th century, encompassing a variety of musical styles and techniques. Part of the broader Romanticism movement of Europe, Ludwig van Beethoven  and Franz Schubert are often seen as the dominant transitional figures composers from the preceding Classical era. Many composers began to channel nationalistic themes, such as Mikhail Glinka, The Five and Belyayev circle in Russia; Frédéric Chopin in Poland; Carl Maria von Weber and Heinrich Marschner in Germany; Edvard Grieg in Norway; Jean Sibelius in Finland; Giuseppe Verdi in Italy; Carl Nielsen in Denmark; Isaac Albéniz in Spain; Ralph Vaughan Williams and Edward Elgar in England; Mykola Lysenko in Ukraine; and Bedřich Smetana and Antonín Dvořák in what is now the Czech Republic.

A European-wide debate took place, particularly in Germany, on what the ideal course of music was, following Beethoven's death. The New German School—primarily Franz Liszt and Richard Wagner—promoted progressive ideas, in opposition to more conservative composers such as Felix Mendelssohn and Robert Schumann.

Note that this list is purely chronological, and also includes a substantial number of composers, especially those born after 1860, whose works cannot be conveniently classified as "Romantic".

Late Classical/early Romantic (born 1770–1799) 

Repertoire key: B=In Classical Net's basic Timeline of Major Composers 1600–present

Early Romantic (born 1800–1819) 
{| class="wikitable sortable"
!Name
!Date born
!Date died
!Nationality
!class=unsortable|Comments
|-
| Jan Kalivoda || 1801 || 1866 || Czech || composer, conductor and violinist
|-
| Vincenzo Bellini || 1801 || 1835 || Italian || opera composer, known for I Puritani, Norma and La sonnambula among others
|-
| Tomasz Padura || 1801 || 1871 || Ukrainian-Polish || poet of the so-called Ukrainian school, musician-torbanist and composer-songwriter
|-
| Charles Auguste de Bériot || 1802 || 1870 || Belgian ||composer and violinist
|-
| Jean-Baptiste Duvernoy || 1802 || 1880 || French || composer and pianist
|-
| Amédée Méreaux || 1802 || 1874 || French ||composer, his works are somewhat known for their immense difficulties
|-
| Cesare Pugni || 1802 || 1870 || Italian ||prolific composer of ballet music
|-
| Eliza Flower || 1803 || 1846 || English || composer
|-
| Friedrich Theodor Fröhlich || 1803 || 1836 || Swiss || composer, composed over 300 pieces for piano
|-
| Adolphe Adam || 1803 || 1856 || French || composer, best known for his ballet score, Giselle
|-
| Hector Berlioz || 1803 || 1869 || French || composer, famous for his programmatic symphony, Symphonie Fantastique
|-
| Henri Herz || 1803 || 1888 || Austrian || composer and pianist
|-
| Franz Lachner || 1803 || 1890 || German || composer and conductor, brother of Ignaz Lachner and Vinzenz Lachner
|-
| Louise Farrenc || 1804 || 1875 || French || composer of three symphonies and many chamber works including the earliest known sextet for piano and wind quintet (1852)
|-
| Mikhail Glinka || 1804 || 1857 || Russian || nationalist composer whose works include the opera, A Life for the Tsar
|-
| Johann Strauss I || 1804 || 1849 || Austrian || dance music composer, famous for Radetzky March
|-
| Fanny Mendelssohn || 1805 || 1847 || German || composer and pianist, sister of Felix Mendelssohn, mainly known for her vocal compositions and chamber music
|-
| Leopold von Zenetti || 1805 || 1892 || Austrian || composer, mainly known for being one of Anton Bruckner's masters
|-
| Napoléon Coste || 1805 || 1883 || French || virtuoso guitarist, teacher and composer
|-
| Juan Crisóstomo Arriaga || 1806 || 1826 || Spanish || composer who died at nineteen and by which time he had already been nicknamed the "Spanish Mozart" for his Symphony in D and three string quartets
|-
| Johann Kaspar Mertz || 1806 || 1856 || Hungarian || composer, known for his guitar pieces
|-
| Johann Friedrich Franz Burgmüller || 1806 || 1874 || German || composer and pianist
|-
| Carlo Curti || 1807 || 1872 || Italian || cellist, performer and educator at Royal School of Music in Parma who composed cello and piano music
|-
| Ignaz Lachner || 1807 || 1895 || German || conductor, composer and organist, a prolific composer, notable for his chamber music such as his string quartets and trios
|-
| Elias Parish Alvars || 1808 || 1849 || English || harpist and composer
|-
| Michael William Balfe || 1808 || 1870 || Irish || conductor and composer, remembered for his opera, The Bohemian Girl
|-
| Sebastián Iradier || 1809 || 1865 || Spanish || composer, best known for La Paloma
|-
| Felix Mendelssohn || 1809 || 1847 || German || conductor, music-director, composer and pianist, brother of Fanny Mendelssohn, best known for Wedding March from A Midsummer Night's Dream
|-
| Otto Lindblad || 1809 || 1864 || Swedish || composer
|-
| Frédéric Chopin || 1810 || 1849 || Polish-French || composer and virtuoso pianist, his works includes nocturnes, ballade, scherzos, etudes and a number of Polish dances such as mazurkas, polonaises and waltzes. 
|-
| Ferenc Erkel || 1810 || 1893 || Hungarian || composer of grand opera
|-
| Otto Nicolai || 1810 || 1849 || German || opera composer and conductor, best known for The Merry Wives of Windsor
|-
| Norbert Burgmüller || 1810 || 1836 || German || composer and brother of Friedrich Burgmüller, praised by Robert Schumann
|-
| Robert Schumann || 1810 || 1856 || German || composer and pianist, husband of Clara Schumann, a significant lieder writer, a prolific composer, wrote many short piano pieces, four symphonies, concerti and chamber music
|-
| Ludwig Schuncke || 1810 || 1834 || German || composer and pianist
|-
| Ferdinand David || 1810 || 1873 || German || composer and violinist
|-
| Vinzenz Lachner || 1811 || 1893 || German || composer, brother of Franz Lachner and Ignaz Lachner
|-
| Franz Liszt || 1811 || 1886 || Hungarian || composer and virtuoso pianist, one of the most influential and distinguished piano composers of the Romantic era and the rival of Robert Schumann and Clara Schumann, wrote a number of symphonic poems and extended piano technique, best known for his Hungarian Rhapsodies and other solo piano works
|-
| Ferdinand Hiller || 1811 || 1885 || German || composer, conductor, writer and music-director, close friend of Felix Mendelssohn. Robert Schumann dedicated his Piano Concerto (Schumann) to him in 1845.
|-
| Wilhelm Taubert ||1811 ||1891|| German || pianist, composer and conductor whose early works received praise from Felix Mendelssohn
|-
| Ambroise Thomas || 1811 || 1896 || French || composer, best known for his two operas, Mignon and Hamlet
|-
| Spyridon Xyndas || 1812 || 1896 || Greek || opera composer and guitarist
|-
| Sigismond Thalberg || 1812 || 1871 || Austrian || composer and one of the most distinguished pianists of the Romantic era
|-
| Louis-Antoine Jullien || 1812 || 1860 || French || conductor and composer of light music, king of promenade concerts in England
|-
| Emilie Mayer || 1812 || 1883 || German || composer of eight symphonies as well as overtures, lieder and numerous chamber works
|-
| Friedrich von Flotow || 1812 || 1883 || German || composer, chiefly remembered for his opera, Martha
|-
| Alexandre Dubuque || 1812 || 1898 || Russian-French || composer, known for teaching
|-
| Johann Rufinatscha || 1812 || 1893 || Austrian || composer
|-
| Alexander Dargomyzhsky || 1813 || 1869 || Russian || composer
|-
| Semen Hulak-Artemovsky || 1813 || 1873 || Ukrainian || opera composer, singer (baritone), actor and dramatist
|-
| George Alexander Macfarren || 1813 || 1887 || English || major opera composer, best known for Robin Hood, She Stoops to Conquer and Helvellyn, also known as a teacher
|-
| Stephen Heller || 1813 || 1888 || Hungarian || composer, highly affected the late Romantic composers
|-
| Richard Wagner || 1813 || 1883 || German || major opera composer, friend of Franz Liszt, best known for his cycle of four operas, Der Ring des Nibelungen
|-
| Ernst Haberbier || 1813 || 1869 || German || composer
|-
| Giuseppe Verdi || 1813 || 1901 || Italian || major opera composer, best known for Nabucco, Rigoletto, La Traviata, Aida, Otello and Don Carlos|-
| Charles-Valentin Alkan || 1813 || 1888 || French || composer and virtuoso pianist
|-
| Antonios Liveralis || 1814 || 1842 || Greek || opera composer and conductor
|-
| Giuseppe Lillo || 1814 || 1863 || Italian || composer, best known for his operas among which is worth noting Odda di Bernaver and Caterina Howard|-
| Adolf von Henselt || 1814 || 1889 || German || composer and pianist
|-
| Josephine Lang || 1815 || 1880 || German || composer and pianist
|-
| Ferdinand Praeger || 1815 || 1891 || German || composer and pianist
|-
| Robert Volkmann || 1815 || 1883 || German || composer, companion of Johannes Brahms
|-
| Józef Władysław Krogulski || 1815 || 1842 || Polish || composer and pianist
|-
| William Sterndale Bennett || 1816 || 1875 || English || composer, conductor and editor
|-
| Charles Dancla || 1817 || 1907 || French || violinist, composer and teacher
|-
| Émile Prudent || 1817 || 1863 || French || pianist and composer
|-
| Károly Thern || 1817 || 1886 || Hungarian || composer, conductor and teacher
|-
| Niels Gade || 1817 || 1890 || Danish || composer, violinist and organist
|-
| Henry Litolff || 1818 || 1891 || British || pianist, composer and music publisher, best known for his five Concerto Symphoniques|-
| Charles Gounod || 1818 || 1893 || French || composer, best known for his two operas, Faust and Roméo et Juliette|-
| Antonio Bazzini || 1818 || 1897 || Italian || violinist, composer and teacher, best known for The Dance of the Goblins|-
| Alexander Dreyschock || 1818 || 1869 || Czech || pianist and composer
|-
| Jacques Offenbach || 1819 || 1880 || French ||  opera and operetta composer, known for The Tales of Hoffmann and Orpheus in the Underworld|-
| Franz von Suppé || 1819 || 1895 || Austrian || composer and conductor, notable for his operetta, Light Cavalry|-
| Stanisław Moniuszko || 1819 || 1872 || Polish || composer, best known as the Father of Polish National Opera
|-
| Clara Schumann || 1819 || 1896 || German || composer and pianist, wife of Robert Schumann, one of the leading pianists of the Romantic era
|-
| Vatroslav Lisinski || 1819 || 1854 || Croatian || composer, famous for his first Croatian opera, Love and Malice and his second Croatian opera, Porin|}

 Middle Romantic (born 1820–1839) 

 Late Romantic (born 1840–1859) 

 Post Romantic (born 1860–1893) 

 Timeline 

 References 
Notes

Sources
  from Classical Net – Composers and Their Works – Timelines

Further reading
 Classical Composers Database: Composers timeline (1800–1900). Retrieved 5 July 2006
 Machlis, Joseph and Forney, Kristine. The Enjoyment of Music: Seventh Edition, W. W. Norton & Company, 1995, 
 Moss, Charles K. . Retrieved 17 January 2009
 Sadie, Julie Anne and Rhian Samuel. The Norton/Grove Dictionary of Women Composers'', W. W. Norton & Company, 1995, 

Romantic